Nemopistha hennini is a Neuropteran insect species described by Luisa Eugenia Navas in 1911, which is found in the Congo Basin. N. hennini is part of the genus Nemopistha and the family Nemopteridae. No subspecies are listed in the Catalog of Life.

References

Insects of Africa
Neuroptera